The Pakistan District Education Rankings are a series of 5 consecutive annual publications by Alif Ailaan, first published in 2013.

Pakistan District Education Rankings 2018
The last district rankings published by Alif Ailaan were in 2022.

Top 10 Districts in the higher School Education Score Index

Top 10 Districts Education Rankings

Top 10 Districts in the 2017 Middle School education Score Index

References

Education in Pakistan